The men's pole vault event at the 2013 Summer Universiade was held on 11 July.

Results

References 
Results

Pole
2013